ff Venture Capital is a venture capital firm that specializes in providing seed-stage and early-stage funding to technology companies. Headquartered in New York City, ff Venture Capital was founded by John Frankel and Alex Katz in 2008, who are general partners at the firm.

In addition to three partners, ff Venture Capital has a large team of investment and operational professionals providing hands-on support and comprehensive guidance and resources to its portfolio companies' management teams, with expertise in communications, marketing and branding, recruiting, product  strategy, financial modeling, accounting and budgeting, community management, and strategic and partner development.

ff Venture Capital has backed companies including Parse.ly, Indiegogo, Livefyre, Klout, Plated, Distil Networks, Ionic Security, Owlet, How About We, 500px, Quigo, Cornerstone on Demand, Authorea.

References 

Financial services companies established in 2008
Venture capital firms of the United States